Thanks for Everything is a Canadian comedy-drama film, directed by Louise Archambault and released in 2019. Her second film to be released in 2019 following And the Birds Rained Down (Il pleuvait des oiseaux), the film stars Julie Perreault and Magalie Lépine-Blondeau as Christine and Marianne Cyr, two estranged sisters who reunite after the death of their father (Gilbert Sicotte), and embark on a road trip to the Magdalen Islands to scatter his ashes.

The film's cast also includes Robin Aubert, Guy Nadon, Patrick Hivon, Jean-François Pichette and Aliocha Schneider.

The film opened in theatres on December 25, 2019, and was the top-grossing Quebec film in its first week of release. It was nominated for two awards at the 22nd Quebec Cinema Awards, Best Supporting Actor for Aubert and the Public Prize.

References

External links
 

2019 films
Canadian road comedy-drama films
Films directed by Louise Archambault
Films shot in Quebec
Films set in Quebec
2010s road comedy-drama films
French-language Canadian films
2010s Canadian films